Jhon Miky Benchy Estama (born 14 June 1994) is a Haitian professional footballer who plays as a forward for Taichung Futuro. Besides Haiti, he has played in Dominican Republic and Taiwan.

Career

Club career

At the age of 15, Estama signed for Haitian top flight side Violette, where they suffered relegation to the Haitian second division. After that, he joined the youth academy of New York Red Bulls in the United States.

In 2015, he trained with a Belgian team.

In 2017, he signed for Dominican Republic club Cibao. After that, he signed for Don Bosco. Before the 2019 season, Estama signed for Hang Yuen in Taiwan, where he was top scorer.  Before the 2020 season, he left Hang Yuen. After that, he signed for Taiwan Steel, helping them win the league.

Before the 2022 season, he signed for Taichung Futuro.

International career

He was a Haiti youth international.

International career

He has refused to represent Haiti internationally due to not wanting to be used as a political tool.

References

External links
 
 Benchy Estama at playmakerstats.com

Association football midfielders
Cibao FC players
Taiwan Football Premier League players
Haitian expatriate sportspeople in the Dominican Republic
1994 births
USL League One players
New York Red Bulls II players
Haitian expatriate sportspeople in the United States
Haitian footballers
Expatriate footballers in the Dominican Republic
Expatriate footballers in Taiwan
Living people
Haitian expatriate footballers
Expatriate soccer players in the United States